Jean-Luc Delpech (born October 27, 1979) is a French former racing cyclist, who competed professionally between 2005 and 2013, all with the  team. He also competed for amateur squads US Montauban 82, GS Jean Floc'h Moreac 56, Entente Sud Gascogne, and EC Trélissac Coulounieix–Chamiers.

Career highlights

2003
 1st, Stage 1, Tour des Pyrénées
 2nd, Overall, Cinturo de l'Emporada
2004
 3rd, Overall, Boucles de la Mayenne
2005
 3rd, Circuit de la Nive
2006
 1st, Stage 3, Tour du Faso, Ouagadougou
 2nd, Circuit de la Nive
 3rd, Prix d'Automne, Rôchefoucault
2007
 1st, Tour du Tarn-et-Garonne
2008
 1st, Stage 5, La Tropicale Amissa Bongo, Libreville
2010
 1st, Boucles de l'Aulne
 1st, Mi-Août Bretonne
2012
1st Overall, Ronde de l'Oise
1st, Stage 4
2013
 2nd, Grand Prix de la Somme
 10th, Grand Prix Pino Cerami

References

External links

1979 births
Living people
French male cyclists
People from Sarlat-la-Canéda
Sportspeople from Dordogne
Cyclists from Nouvelle-Aquitaine